The 2020 Leinster Senior Football Championship is the 2020 iteration of Leinster Senior Football Championship organised by Leinster GAA.

The tournament was won by Dublin, their 59th Leinster championship, and tenth in a row, en route to their sixth consecutive All-Ireland title.

Teams
The Leinster championship was contested by 11 of the 12 county teams in Leinster, a province of Ireland. Kilkenny was the only county team not to compete.

(i) = interim

Shane Roche was originally a selector but was appointed interim manager of Wexford after Paul Galvin left suddenly in September 2020. Roche was formally ratified for a two-year term as manager in January 2021.

Championship draw
The draw for the preliminary rounds and quarter-finals was released by Leinster GAA on 7 October 2019. In a change to previous years' championships, a separate draw for the semi-finals was due to take place once the quarter final ties had been played, however, due to the impact of the COVID-19 pandemic on Gaelic games and the resultant rescheduling of the 2020 All-Ireland Senior Football Championship, the draw for the Semi-Finals was made on 26 June 2020.

Matches

Preliminary round

Quarter-finals

Semi-finals

Final

See also
 2020 All-Ireland Senior Football Championship
 2020 Connacht Senior Football Championship
 2020 Munster Senior Football Championship
 2020 Ulster Senior Football Championship

References

External links
 http://www.leinstergaa.ie/

2L
Leinster Championship
Leinster Senior Football Championship